Kim Jung-mi (or  ; born 16 October 1984) is a South Korean footballer for the Incheon Red Angels and the South Korea women's national football team.

Career
Kim participated as a goalkeeper at the 2015 FIFA Women's World Cup in Canada.

References

External links

Kim Jung-mi at Incheon Hyundai Steel
National team stats 

1984 births
Living people
South Korean women's footballers
South Korea women's international footballers
2015 FIFA Women's World Cup players
WK League players
Women's association football goalkeepers
Asian Games medalists in football
Footballers at the 2006 Asian Games
Footballers at the 2014 Asian Games
Asian Games bronze medalists for South Korea
FIFA Century Club
Medalists at the 2014 Asian Games
Incheon Hyundai Steel Red Angels WFC players
2003 FIFA Women's World Cup players